Karlee is an English feminine given name that is a feminine form of Carl and an alternate form of Carla. Notable people known by this name include the following:

Given name
Karlee Bispo (born 1990), American competition swimmer
Karlee Burgess (born 1998), Canadian curler
Karlee Macer (born 1971), American politician
 Karlee Perez, known as Catrina (wrestler), (born 1986) is an American actress, model, professional wrestler and valet

See also

Carlee
Karle (name)
Karleen
Karlene
Karlie

Notes

English feminine given names